Traci Falbo holds the world record for the 48-hour indoor ultramarathon. On August 6, 2014, she completed the 2-day event in Anchorage, Alaska, with a distance of 389.61 km.

References 

Year of birth missing (living people)
Living people
American female ultramarathon runners
21st-century American women